Limestone Mountain is a summit in West Virginia, in the United States.

Limestone Mountain was named for its blue limestone rock formations.

References

Mountains of Preston County, West Virginia
Mountains of Tucker County, West Virginia
Mountains of West Virginia